Rossiya or Rossija (the Romanization of the word ) may refer to:
 Russia
 Rossiya (icebreaker), Russian icebreakers named Rossiya
 Rossiya or Rossia, an Imperial Russian cruiser launched in 1896
 Rossiya, an Imperial Russian ship of the line launched in 1839
 Rossiya Airlines, owned by the Russian government and based in Saint Petersburg
 Rossija (train), a passenger train service Moscow-Vladivostok through the Trans-Siberian Railway
 Rossiya Bank (Russia Bank), a Russian joint stock bank based in St. Petersburg
 Rossiya Hotel (Russia Hotel) in Moscow, demolished 2006-2007
 Rossiya 1 (Russia 1, previously RTR), a Russian TV channel
 Rossiya 2 (Russia 2, previously Sport TV), a Russian TV channel

See also 
 Russia (disambiguation)